The Tamil Nadu Democratic Construction Labour Union is a trade union of construction workers in the state of Tamil Nadu, India. TNDCLU is affiliated with the All India Central Council of Trade Unions. TNDCLU hopes to increase its membership to 15,000 during 2005.

Trade unions in India
All India Central Council of Trade Unions
Building and construction trade unions